Li Feng may refer to:

 Li Feng (athlete) (born 1965), Chinese Olympic sprinter
 Li Feng (李豐), military officer serving under the warlord Yuan Shu in the Eastern Han dynasty
 Li Feng (Cao Wei) (李豐), official of the Cao Wei state in the Three Kingdoms period
 Li Feng (Three Kingdoms) (李豐), son of the Shu Han state general Li Yan (Three Kingdoms) in the Three Kingdoms period
 Li Feng (sinologist) (李峰), Columbia University sinologist
 Li Feng (rapist) (栗峰), executed rapist

See also
Li & Fung